Museum of Fine Arts (French: Musée des Beaux-Arts; German: Museum der bildenden Künste) may refer to:

Argentina 
 Museo Nacional de Bellas Artes (Buenos Aires), Buenos Aires

Austria 
 Kunsthistorisches Museum, Vienna

Belgium 
 Royal Museums of Fine Arts of Belgium, Brussels
 Museum of Fine Arts, Antwerp
 Museum of Fine Arts, Ghent
 Museum of Fine Arts, Ostend
 Musée des Beaux-Arts Tournai

Brazil 
 National Museum of Fine Arts, Rio de Janeiro

Canada 
 Montreal Museum of Fine Arts, Montreal
 National Gallery of Canada (Musée des beaux-arts du Canada), Ottawa
 Musée national des beaux-arts du Québec (The Quebec National Museum of Fine Art), Quebec City

Chile 
 Chilean National Museum of Fine Arts, Santiago

France 
 Musée des Beaux-Arts d'Angers
 Musée des Beaux-Arts de Besançon
 Musée des Beaux-Arts de Bordeaux
 Musée des Beaux-Arts de Brest, Brest
 Musée des Beaux-Arts de Caen
 Musée des beaux-arts de Chambéry
 Musée des Beaux-Arts de Dijon
 Museum of Fine Arts, Dole
 Museum of Grenoble
 , La Rochelle
 Musée des Beaux-Arts de Lille
 Museum of Fine Arts of Lyon
 Musée des beaux-arts de Marseille
 Musée des Beaux-Arts de Mulhouse
 Museum of Fine Arts of Nancy
 Musée des Beaux-Arts de Nantes
 Musée des Beaux-Arts de Nice
 Petit Palais (Museum of Fine Arts of Paris)
 Musée des Beaux-Arts d'Orléans
 Musée des Beaux-Arts de Quimper
 Museum of Fine Arts of Rennes
 Museum of Fine Arts, Rheims
 Musée des Beaux-Arts de Rouen
 Musée des Beaux-Arts de Strasbourg
 Musée des Beaux-Arts de Tours
 Musée des Beaux-Arts de Valenciennes, Valenciennes
 Musée des Beaux-arts et de la Dentelle d'Alençon

Germany
 Museum der bildenden Künste, Leipzig

Hungary
 Museum of Fine Arts (Budapest), Hungary

Japan
 Museum of Fine Arts, Gifu, Japan

Philippines
 National Museum of Fine Arts (Manila)

Russia
 Pushkin Museum (Pushkin Museum of Fine Arts), Moscow

Taiwan
 Kaohsiung Museum of Fine Arts, Kaohsiung
 National Taiwan Museum of Fine Arts, Taichung
 Kuandu Museum of Fine Arts, Taipei
 Lingnan Fine Arts Museum, Taipei
 Taipei Fine Arts Museum, Taipei

United States
 Museum of Fine Arts (St. Petersburg, Florida)
 Museum of Fine Arts, Boston,  Massachusetts
 Michele and Donald D'Amour Museum of Fine Arts, Springfield, Massachusetts
 New Mexico Museum of Art (formerly the Museum of Fine Arts)
 Museum of Fine Arts, Houston, Texas

Other uses
 "Musée des Beaux Arts" (poem), by W. H. Auden

See also
 Museum of Arts (disambiguation)
 Museum of Fine Art (disambiguation)